Ankyrin repeat domain-containing protein 26 is a protein that in humans is encoded by the ANKRD26 gene. This protein has a function that is not currently understood.

Ankyrin repeat domain-containing protein 26 is a protein that in humans is encoded by the ANKRD26 gene.

Gene 
ANKRD26 is found on chromosome 10, at 10q21. It has 6816 base pairs in the reference sequence mRNA transcript.

Neighborhood 
LOC100289548 (PUTAETIVE UNCHARACTERIZED PROTEIN C10ORF52-LIKE) is located directly to the left (3') of ANKRD26, and is a protein coding gene located at 10p12.1. It has an unknown function. On the other side of LOC100289548  is NCRNA00202 non-protein coding RNA 202. On the 5' end of ANKRD26, YME1L1 can be found at 10q14.1. The protein encoded by the YME1-like 1 is an ortholog of yeast mitochondrial AAAmetalloprotease.  This gene is thought to play a role in mitochondrial protein metabolism.   On the positive strand of human chromosome ten, located next to the 5' end of ANKRD26 is MASTL, microtubule associated serine/threonine kinase-like. This particular gene encodes the microtubule associated serine/threonine kinase.1 Mutations within these gene have been expected to be associated with thrombocytopenia-2.

Protein 

Ankyrin repeat domain-containing protein 26 has three conserved domains: ANK, SbcC, and DUF3496. ANK conserved domain is located from amino acid 74-199. Ankyrin repeats are found to mediate protein-protein interactions, and also contains two antiparallel helices, as well as a beta-hairpin. SbcC conserved domain can be found from amino acid 743-1333, and is domain associated with ATPase involved in DNA repair. There is also a domain of unknown function from amino acid 1538-1649.

Expression 
In humans ANKRD26 was seen to be most highly expressed in the ear, lymph, esophagus, parathyroid, and placenta, as well as, most commonly seen in esophageal tumors and lymphoma, as well as seen in the blastocyst, fetus, juvenile, and adult developmental stages. In humans this is associated at all stages of life with lymphoma cancer as well as esophageal tumors. The association with expression in tissues and disease states doesn't show enough difference to link one another.

References

External links

Further reading